Stan Wawrinka was the defending champion, but chose not to participate this year.

Martin Kližan won the title, defeating Gaël Monfils in the final, 6–7(1–7), 6–3, 6–1.

Seeds

Draw

Finals

Top half

Bottom half

Qualifying

Seeds

Qualifiers

Lucky losers

Qualifying draw

First qualifier

Second qualifier

Third qualifier

Fourth qualifier

External links
 Main draw
 Qualifying draw

2016 ABN AMRO World Tennis Tournament
ABN AMRO World Tennis Tournament - Men's Singles